Mutant Chronicles is a 2008 British-American science fiction action-horror film, loosely based on the role-playing game of the same name. The film was directed by Simon Hunter, and stars Thomas Jane and Ron Perlman.

It was released throughout Europe in 2008, followed by a North American VOD on March 27, 2009, and a theatrical release for selected cities on April 24, 2009. The film was released on DVD and Blu-ray on August 4, 2009.

Plot
The story is set in the year 2707. The world is loosely based on that of the Mutant Chronicles role-playing game, in which many technologies are steam powered and mankind has exhausted Earth's natural resources. The protagonists must battle against mutated humans that were accidentally unleashed.

The plot revolves around a "machine" which came from space 10,000 years ago. The "machine" mutates people into barely intelligent killing drones, known as "mutants", that drag new victims to the machine for conversion. Sealed away thousands of years ago by human tribes, the machine is accidentally uncovered during a large battle in Eastern Europe between two (Capitol and Bauhaus) of the four corporations that now rule the world (the other two being Mishima and Imperial). Within six weeks the world is almost completely overrun by the mutant gangs. Some of the population has been evacuated to Mars, but millions remain on the doomed Earth. A group of soldiers are assembled to take another ancient device to the heart of the machine in an attempt to destroy it in a suicide mission. In return, their loved ones receive coveted tickets to Mars.

En route their spaceship is shot down by a kamikaze airship piloted by a mutant. The group is forced to battle through the mutants in tunnels to reach the machine, hoping to save the last of humanity. In their attempt to reach the machine most die, with Mitch being partially transformed into a mutant and Brother Samuel being fully transformed. Mitch is able to halt his own transformation, but is forced to kill Brother Samuel. Mitch, being the last survivor, is ultimately successful in activating the ancient device, causing the machine (which was actually part of a spacecraft) not to be destroyed but to blast off into space.

A dying and mutated Samuel tells him to "have faith" as Mitch jumps from the slowly ascending rocket, landing in an underground lake beneath the rocket. Crawling onto land he sees the rocket disappear into the sky, realizing he is the prophesied savior of mankind, despite not believing in a god. Grievously wounded and partially mutated, he unsuccessfully attempts to light a final crooked cigarette. The final plan shows the rocket en route to the red planet.

Cast
 Thomas Jane as Sergeant John Mitchell "Mitch" Hunter
 Ron Perlman as Brother Samuel
 Devon Aoki as Corporal Valerie Chinois Duval
 Benno Fürmann as Lieutenant Maximillian Emile Von Steiner
 Sean Pertwee as Nathan Rooker
 John Malkovich as Constantine
 Anna Walton as Severian
 Luis Echegaray as Corporal Jesus "El Jesus" de Barrera
 Shauna Macdonald as Adelaide
 Tom Wu as Corporal Juba Kim Wu
 Steve Toussaint as Captain John Patrick McGuire
 Roger Ashton-Griffiths as Science Monk
 Curtis Walker as "Bigboy"

Production
Producer Edward R. Pressman had planned as far back as the mid-90s to adapt Mutant Chronicles with an incarnation of the project helmed by John Carpenter stalled in development due to Pressman suffering back-to-back under-performances of Judge Dredd, The Crow: City of Angels, and The Island of Dr. Moreau. Pressman then later set up an incarnation of the project at 20th Century Fox with Stephen Norrington slated to direct, but after facing several delays related to concerns of the budget Norrington left to direct Blade. An incarnation to be helmed by Roger Christian also failed to come together with Christian instead making Battlefield Earth.

Critical reception

The site's critical consensus reads, "Bad acting, poor CGI and clunky script mean this sci-fi thriller is lacking in all departments including the thrills."

References

External links
 
 
 
 
  Dinamo Productions - visual effects]
 Mutant Chronicles screening 
 Mutant Chronicles Teaser Trailer

2000s monster movies
2000s action horror films
2008 science fiction action films
2000s science fiction horror films
2008 films
American monster movies
American science fiction action films
American science fiction horror films
American post-apocalyptic films
American splatter films
British splatter films
British monster movies
British science fiction action films
British science fiction horror films
Films based on role-playing games
Films set in the 28th century
British post-apocalyptic films
Steampunk films
Works based on role-playing games
2000s English-language films
2000s American films
2000s British films